In Greek mythology, Cycnus (Ancient Greek: Κύκνος means "swan") or Cygnus, was the king of the town of Kolonai in the southern Troad.

Family 
Cycnus was the son of Poseidon by Calyce (daughter of Hecaton), Harpale, or by Scamandrodice. According to John Tzetzes, his mother Scamandrodice abandoned him on the seashore, but he was rescued by fishermen who named him Cycnus "swan" because they saw a swan flying over him. In another account, he was said to have had womanly white skin and fair hair, which was why he received his name that meant "swan".

Cycnus married first Procleia, daughter of King Laomedon of Troy or of Laomedon's son Clytius. Cycnus and Procleia had two children, named Tenes and Hemithea, although Tenes claimed the god Apollo as his father. On Procleia's death, Cycnus married Philonome, daughter of Tragasus (Cragasus), also known as Polyboea or Scamandria. 

Dictys Cretensis mentions three more children of Cycnus: two sons, Cobis and Corianus, and a daughter Glauce.

Mythology 
Philonome fell in love with her handsome stepson, Tenes. Tenes rejected Philonome's advances, whereupon Philonome falsely accused Tenes before her husband of having ravished her. Cycnus ordered to place both his children in a chest and throw it into the sea. However, Cycnus discovered the truth and had Philonome buried alive. When he found that his children had survived and were reigning at Tenedos, he sailed there intending to reconcile with them, but Tenes cut the anchor rope of his ship.

Cycnus later supported the Trojans in the Trojan War, and fought valiantly, killing one thousand opponents according to Ovid. According to some accounts he killed the Greek hero Protesilaus, but according to others, Cycnus attacked the Greek camp when the funeral of Protesilaus was underway. It was said that Cycnus, being the son of Poseidon, was invulnerable to spear and sword attack. When Achilles confronted Cycnus he could not kill him via conventional weaponry so he crushed and suffocated him. After his death, Cycnus was changed into a swan.  Later, the Greek army invaded Cycnus's kingdom, but the people of Colonae implored them to spare the city. The Greek leaders agreed, on condition that Cobis, Corianus and Glauce be handed over to them, and made a truce with the citizens.

Legacy 
Virgil borrowed heavily from Cycnus when making the character Messapus for the Aeneid. Messapus is the son of Neptune, and like Cycnus was said to be invulnerable.

Notes

References 

 Conon, Fifty Narrations, surviving as one-paragraph summaries in the Bibliotheca (Library) of Photius, Patriarch of Constantinople translated from the Greek by Brady Kiesling. Online version at the Topos Text Project.
 Dictys Cretensis, from The Trojan War. The Chronicles of Dictys of Crete and Dares the Phrygian translated by Richard McIlwaine Frazer, Jr. (1931-). Indiana University Press. 1966. Online version at the Topos Text Project.
 Diodorus Siculus, The Library of History translated by Charles Henry Oldfather. Twelve volumes. Loeb Classical Library. Cambridge, Massachusetts: Harvard University Press; London: William Heinemann, Ltd. 1989. Vol. 3. Books 4.59–8. Online version at Bill Thayer's Web Site
 Diodorus Siculus, Bibliotheca Historica. Vol 1-2. Immanel Bekker. Ludwig Dindorf. Friedrich Vogel. in aedibus B. G. Teubneri. Leipzig. 1888-1890. Greek text available at the Perseus Digital Library.
 Gaius Julius Hyginus, Fabulae from The Myths of Hyginus translated and edited by Mary Grant. University of Kansas Publications in Humanistic Studies. Online version at the Topos Text Project.
 Pausanias, Description of Greece with an English Translation by W.H.S. Jones, Litt.D., and H.A. Ormerod, M.A., in 4 Volumes. Cambridge, MA, Harvard University Press; London, William Heinemann Ltd. 1918. Online version at the Perseus Digital Library
 Pausanias, Graeciae Descriptio. 3 vols. Leipzig, Teubner. 1903.  Greek text available at the Perseus Digital Library.
 Publius Ovidius Naso, Metamorphoses translated by Brookes More (1859-1942). Boston, Cornhill Publishing Co. 1922. Online version at the Perseus Digital Library.
 Publius Ovidius Naso, Metamorphoses. Hugo Magnus. Gotha (Germany). Friedr. Andr. Perthes. 1892. Latin text available at the Perseus Digital Library.
 Strabo, The Geography of Strabo. Edition by H.L. Jones. Cambridge, Mass.: Harvard University Press; London: William Heinemann, Ltd. 1924. Online version at the Perseus Digital Library.
 Strabo, Geographica edited by A. Meineke. Leipzig: Teubner. 1877. Greek text available at the Perseus Digital Library.

Trojans
Kings in Greek mythology
Metamorphoses characters
Children of Poseidon
Metamorphoses into birds in Greek mythology